The Shelton Invitational (also known as Shelton Invite) is an annual high school level track and field invitational meet held at Shelton High School's Highclimber Stadium in Shelton, Washington.

History
Created in 1960, it is the longest running track invitational in Washington state. It was formed when the Centralia Relays meet (1930s to 1950s) ceased to exist, leaving the Western Washington region with no multi-team meets. Multi-team meets are created for coaches to challenge their top athletes with other top athletes from different schools. It was Aberdeen High School who won four of the first five Shelton Invites. As the years went by, the invite saw up to over 30 schools signed up per year. Sixteen years later, Shelton was seeing over 50 schools per year. By the 1980s, multi-team meets were becoming increasingly popular and started taking its toll on Shelton's entry list. In 1999, the Shelton Invite organizers began an effort to regain the meets status that it once had. The "new" Shelton Invite gathers the top sixteen athletes in Washington State high schools for each event. 2013 had a record number of 62 teams enter with their best athletes. The Shelton invite is considered Washington's No. 1 Elite track and field meet and one of the hardest to qualify for.

Meet Records

Boy's Records

Girl's Records

External links
Shelton Invite official website

References

Track and field competitions in the United States
Track and field in Washington (state)